The 1914 Wyoming Cowboys football team was an American football team that represented the University of Wyoming as a member of the Rocky Mountain Conference (RMC) during the 1914 college football season. In their second and final season under head coach Ralph Thacker, the Cowboys compiled a 1–5 record (0–5 against conference opponents), finished last out of eight teams in the RMC, and were outscored by a total of 158 to 31.

Schedule

References

Wyoming
Wyoming Cowboys football seasons
Wyoming Cowboys football